Hans Appel (8 June 1911 – 27 July 1973) was a German footballer who played as a defender who played as a defender for Hertha BSC, Berliner SV 92, Dresdner SC and FC St. Pauli. He also represented the Germany national team, and was capped five times between 1933 and 1938.

External links
 
 

1911 births
1973 deaths
Footballers from Berlin
German footballers
Association football defenders
Germany international footballers
Hertha BSC players
Dresdner SC players
FC St. Pauli players
German football managers
FC St. Pauli managers
20th-century German people